Merrill Piepkorn (born May 20, 1949) is an American politician who has served in the North Dakota Senate from the 44th district since 2016.

References

1949 births
Living people
Democratic Party North Dakota state senators
Politicians from Fargo, North Dakota
21st-century American politicians